Mr. Mayor is an American sitcom television series created by Tina Fey and Robert Carlock for NBC. The series stars Ted Danson, Bobby Moynihan, Holly Hunter, Vella Lovell, Mike Cabellon, and Kyla Kenedy and premiered on January 7, 2021. In March 2021, the series was renewed for a second season. A holiday special episode aired on December 15, 2021, and the second season premiered on March 15, 2022. In May 2022, the series was canceled after two seasons.

Premise
Neil Bremer (Ted Danson) is a wealthy businessman who runs for mayor of Los Angeles "for all the wrong reasons." Once he wins he has to figure out what he stands for, gain the respect of his staff, and connect with his teenage daughter, all while controlling the coyote population."

Cast

Main

 Ted Danson as Neil Bremer, a retired billboard ad executive who runs for, and becomes, Mayor of Los Angeles to earn his daughter's respect.
 Holly Hunter as Arpi Meskimen, the deputy mayor of Los Angeles and a former city councilwoman of thirty years with her no-nonsense attitude.
 Vella Lovell as Mikaela Shaw, Neil's chief of staff and a social media influencer, who is the good friend of Tommy.
 Mike Cabellon as Tommy Tomás, Neil's chief strategist, who is the good friend of Mikaela.
 Kyla Kenedy as Orly Bremer, Neil's daughter who enjoys embarrassing him.
 Bobby Moynihan as Jayden Kwapis, Neil's communications director whose bumbling personality hides his street smarts and political instincts.
 Yedoye Travis as James, a strategist hired by Neil to modernize Los Angeles (Season 2)

Recurring
 Josie Totah as Titi B, a popular social media influencer and Mayor Bremer's nemesis
 Benito Martinez as Mayor Victor Delgado
 Rachel Dratch as Ms. Adams
 Jennifer DeFilippo as Valerie
 Josh Sussman as Leslie, an employee in the Mayor's office
 Anna Camp as Natalie, Neil's deceased wife and Orly's deceased mother

Guest

Episodes

Series overview

Season 1 (2021)

Special (2021)

Season 2 (2022)

Production

Development
On July 18, 2019, it was reported that NBC had given a 13-episode straight-to-series order to an untitled Tina Fey and Robert Carlock comedy starring Ted Danson, who is set to play a wealthy businessman running for mayor of Los Angeles. Originally meant to be a spin-off/continuation of Fey's series 30 Rock, the series was to star Alec Baldwin reprising his 30 Rock role of Jack Donaghy, following his political career in New York City. After around a year of negotiations, Baldwin dropped out of the project and was replaced with Danson. Danson refused to move from Los Angeles to New York, so the series was rewritten to take place there.

On May 11, 2020, it was announced that the series would be called Mr. Mayor. The series would be executive produced by Tina Fey, Jeff Richmond, Robert Carlock and David Miner. Production companies involved with the series include Little Stranger, Bevel Gears, 3 Arts Entertainment and Universal Television. A first-look tease of the series was included as an end tag on the Peacock stream of "30 Rock: A One-Time Special" uploaded on July 16, 2020. The first season began airing on NBC on January 7, 2021, and concluded after nine episodes on February 25, 2021. On March 22, 2021, the series was renewed for a second season. On May 12, 2022, NBC canceled the series after two seasons, causing the show to end on a cliffhanger.

Casting
In 2019, Deadline reported Bobby Moynihan had joined the cast as Jayden and later that Holly Hunter had also joined the cast as Arpi. In early 2020 Vella Lovell joined the cast as Mikaela, Mike Cabellon joined the cast as Tommy, and Kyla Kenedy joined the cast as Orly Bremer.

Filming

On March 12, 2020, Universal Television suspended the production of the series amid the emergence of COVID-19 in the United States. Filming for the first season commenced shortly after, but was put on hold once again on December 14, 2020, after several crew members tested positive for COVID-19. The following day, it was reported that production would be suspended for the rest of 2020 and was scheduled to resume in January 2021. However, filming for the first season did not resume and the season was cut four episodes short due to the pandemic.

Broadcast 
The first season of the show premiered on NBC with two episodes on January 7, 2021. In July 2020, an end tag of "30 Rock: A One Time Special" on its post-broadcast stream on Peacock included a teaser trailer of the series and later that year in November 2020, a trailer was released. The nine-episode season concluded with the episode "#PalmTreeReform" on February 25, 2021. The series was acquired by Citytv in Canada. A holiday special episode titled "Mr. Mayor's Magical L.A. Christmas" aired on December 15, 2021, as the second season premiere, ahead of the second season time slot premiere which is March 15, 2022.

Reception

Critical response
On Rotten Tomatoes, the series holds an approval rating of 44% based on 32 reviews, with an average rating of 4.79/10. The website's critics consensus reads, "Mr. Mayor first term suffers from a lack of specificity, leading to broad jokes and wayward plots—still, a reliably winsome Ted Danson and a silly sensibility may be enough for some viewers." On Metacritic, it has a weighted average score of 53 out of 100, based on 22 reviews, indicating "mixed or average reviews". LaToya Ferguson of The A.V. Club gave the fifth and sixth episodes better grades mentioning the lack of Orly in them, noting "these past two episodes have solidified just how superfluous the Orly character and the family sitcom aspect of the series really are."

Ratings

Season 1

Special

Season 2

Notes

References

External links
 

2020s American political comedy television series
2020s American satirical television series
2020s American LGBT-related comedy television series
2020s American workplace comedy television series
2020s American single-camera sitcoms
2021 American television series debuts
2022 American television series endings
Fictional mayors
English-language television shows
NBC original programming
Political satirical television series
Television productions postponed due to the COVID-19 pandemic
Television series by 3 Arts Entertainment
Television series by Universal Television
Television series created by Tina Fey
Television shows filmed in Los Angeles
Television shows set in Los Angeles
American LGBT-related sitcoms

Accolades
2021 Peabody Award Winner